Arifki Eka Putra (born February 19, 1987) is an Indonesian footballer that currently plays for Badak Lampung in the Liga 1.

Club statistics

References

External links

1987 births
Association football defenders
Association football midfielders
Badak Lampung F.C. players
Indonesian footballers
Liga 1 (Indonesia) players
Persisam Putra Samarinda players
Bontang F.C. players
Living people
People from Bengkulu